Sociological Theory is a peer-reviewed journal published by SAGE Publications for the American Sociological Association. The journal's purpose is to cover the full breadth of sociological theory. The editor-in-chief is Iddo Tavory (New York University). According to the Journal Citation Reports, the journal has a 2020 impact factor of 2.703, ranking it 17th out of 150 journals in the category "Sociology".

References

External links
 

Publications established in 1983
Sociology journals
SAGE Publishing academic journals
American Sociological Association academic journals